The 2005 El Mreiti base attack occurred on 4 June 2005 when militants from the Salafist Group for Preaching and Combat, a predecessor group of AQIM, attacked a remote army garrison in western Mauritania, killing eighteen government troops and capturing a significant amount of weapons. According to a statement released by militants, the attackers surrounded the base and engaged in a battle that lasted several hours, eventually breaching the base, seizing large quantities of weapons and ammunition, and fleeing. The same statement claimed that fifty Mauritanian troops had been killed in the assault. Five GSPC militants, all Algerian nationals, were killed during the battle. The attack was led by Mokhtar Belmokhtar, an Algerian jihadist and veteran of the Soviet–Afghan War. It was one of the first al-Qaeda linked operations to occur on Mauritanian soil and spurred the government of Mauritania to ally with Algeria and Mali in a bid to root out militants in the region.

See also
 2007 killing of French tourists in Mauritania
 2009 Nouakchott suicide bombing
 History of Mauritania (1991–present)

References

Terrorist incidents in Africa in 2005
Terrorist incidents attributed to al-Qaeda in the Islamic Maghreb
Mass murder in 2005
Terrorism deaths in Mauritania
Terrorist incidents in Mauritania
2005 in Mauritania
2005 crimes in Mauritania

Conflicts in 2005